The Crucea – Botușana mine is a large mine in the northeast of Romania in Suceava County, 145 km southeast of Suceava and c. 400 km north of the capital, Bucharest. Crucea - Botușana represents the second largest uranium reserve in Romania having estimated reserves of 30 million tonnes of uranium ore grading 0.5% uranium metal thus resulting in 150,000 tonnes of high grade metal.

References 

Uranium mines in Romania